Order from Chaos was an extreme metal band formed in 1987 in Kansas City, Missouri, by Pete Helmkamp, Chuck Keller and Mike Miller. They are recognised as being an extremely influential group in the early U.S. black metal scene, and served as a launching pad for its band members that went on to form such groups as Angelcorpse, Ares Kingdom, Revenge, Vulpecula, and Kerasphorus.

Biography
Order from Chaos, a trio consisting of Pete Helmkamp (vocals/bass), Chuck Keller (guitar) and Mike Miller (drums), was formed in Kansas City, Missouri, during 1987, playing a mixture of old school thrash, black and death metal, influenced by the likes of Venom, Bathory and Celtic Frost. The band released a trio of demos in 1988, until a fourth (Crushed Infamy), which sold 1000 copies, attracted the attention of Putrefaction Records who released the Will to Power 7-inch EP, limited to 1100 copies. The band then signed a record deal with Wild Rags in 1989, who released cassette versions of the Crushed Infamy demo and Will to Power. A final demo, Alienus Sum, was released in 1992 by the band, featuring three rough mixes from their delayed debut album and a couple of rehearsal tracks; an official cassette version of the demo was released through Chilean label Hexateuc Torment.

Despite being recorded in April/May 1991, Order from Chaos's debut album, Stillbirth Machine, was finally released in 1992 through Wild Rags, despite the label dropping the band in November 1992. Around the same time, the album was also released by Greek label Decapitated Records (now Unisound Productions). This version, which differs from the Wild Rags in terms of artwork and layout and contains numerous textual errors, is apparently considered a bootleg version by the band. The album was given official re-releases by Osmose Productions in 1998 (including the Crushed Infamy demo) and Nuclear War Now! in 2008 (on both black and clear yellow vinyl). The album has received some critical acclaim; Terrorizer included it in their "top 40 death metal albums you must hear", at number 40. James Hoare commented, "The blasphemous babysteps of Peter Helmkamp, [...] Order from Chaos courted black metal's glass shards of spite and embittered, semi-mystical worldview in an ear when the two genres were defined by their opposition, setting down the foundations for further esoteric and impenetrable coupling.".

A series of further EPs were recorded and released throughout 1994 on various labels (Jericho Trumpet on Gestapo, Live: Into Distant Fears on Eternal Darkness and Plateau of Invincibility on Shivadarshana), followed by a second full-length, Dawn Bringer, on Shivadarshana, before the band decided to call it quits in 1995. After Shivardashana folded, French label Osmose picked up tracks recorded in 1995 for Order from Chaos's third and final album and released An Ending in Fire in 1998, as well as re-releasing their debut.

Pete Helmkamp went on to form death metal act Angelcorpse, as well as writing a book on occultism, entitled The Conqueror Manifesto: Capricornus Teitan. Chuck Keller and Mike Miller went on to form retro black/thrash band Ares Kingdom and blackened death metal act Vulpecula. With interest in Order from Chaos still prevalent in the extreme metal underground, Merciless records released a compilation of demos, 1994 live tracks and rehearsal sessions, entitled Imperium - The Apocalyptic Visions, in July 2005.

Last known line-up
 Pete Helmkamp (vocals, bass)
 Chuck Keller (guitar)
 Mike Miller (drums)

Discography

Demos
 Demo I (self-released, January 1988)
 Inhumanities (self-released, July 1988)
 Rehearsal (self-released, 1988)
 Crushed Infamy (Wild Rags, July 1989)
 Alienus Sum (self-released, 1992; reissued by Hexateuc Torment, 1994)

EPs
 Will to Power (EP, Putrefaction / Wild Rags, 1990)
 Jericho Trumpet (7-inch EP, Gestapo, 1994)
 Live: Into Distant Fears (7-inch EP, Eternal Darkness, 1994)
 Plateau of Invincibility (10-inch EP, Shivadarshana, 1994)
 Pain Lengthens Time (unreleased EP, 1994; included with the Dawnbringer CD)
 And I Saw Eternity (EP, Ground Zero / Shivadarshana, 1996)

Full-length LPs
 Stillbirth Machine (Wild Rags, 1993; reissued by Osmose, 1998; reissued by Nuclear War Now!, 2008)
 Dawn Bringer (Shivadarshana, 1995; reissed by Fifth Division, 2003)
 An Ending in Fire (Osmose, 1998; reissued by Nuclear War Now!, 2008)
 Imperium - The Apocalyptic Visions (compilation, Merciless, 2005)

References

American black metal musical groups
American death metal musical groups
American thrash metal musical groups
Heavy metal musical groups from Missouri
Musical groups established in 1987
Musical groups disestablished in 1995
Musical groups from Kansas City, Missouri